Maarsbergen is a settlement in the Dutch province of Utrecht. It is a part of the municipality of Utrechtse Heuvelrug, and lies about 18 km east of Utrecht.

History 
It was first mentioned in 1134 as Merseberch. The etymology is unclear. The village developed near . Huis Maarsbergen was a 15th century walled castle. The castle was confiscated in 1656, and sold to Samuel de Marez who transformed it into an estate. The Dutch Reformed Church was built between 1883 and 1884, and a tower was added in 1934. In 1840, Maarsbergen was home to 262 people. Between 1845 and 1972, there was a railway station in Maarsbergen.

Gallery

References

Populated places in Utrecht (province)
Utrechtse Heuvelrug